Richard Dembo (24 May 1948 – 11 November 2004) was a French director and screenwriter.

Dembo achieved worldwide recognition with his first film: La diagonale du fou, which received an Oscar in 1984 for best foreign film, as well as other numerous awards (César, Prix Louis Delluc). Michel Piccoli starred in the film as a Jewish citizen
of the USSR.

In 1993, Dembo directed L'instinct de l'ange with Hélène Vincent, Jean-Louis Trintignant, François Cluzet und Lambert Wilson. After a long pause, during which he directed no films, Dembo directed his last film Nina's House.

On 11 November 2004, Dembo unexpectedly died in Paris under the symptoms of an intestinal obstruction. He was buried in Israel.

References

External links
 

1948 births
2004 deaths
French film directors
Directors of Best Foreign Language Film Academy Award winners
Deaths from bowel obstruction